In contrast to a downward pointing dolphin striker, a pelican striker is a small vertical spar or pyramid arrangement attached to the top of the crossbar joining the two bows of a catamaran.  Its purpose is to resist the upward pressure on the centre of the crossbar where the forestay is attached.

Sailing rigs and rigging
Sailboat components

pl:Delfiniak